East Island can refer to the following islands:

Americas 
 East Island, Hawaii, an island washed away by a storm surge
 East Island (Oregon)
 East Island, Rhode Island
 East Falkland

Oceania 
 East Island (Ashmore and Cartier Islands)
 East Island (Lacepede Islands), Western Australia
 East Island (Mary Anne Group), Western Australia
 East Island, Hawaii, an island washed away by a storm surge
 East Island/Whangaokeno, New Zealand
 East Island, Papua New Guinea
 East Island (South Australia)
 East Island (Tasmania)

Elsewhere 
 East Island (Andaman and Nicobar Islands)

See also
 Île de l'Est, Crozet Archipelago, Indian Ocean
 Eastern Island (disambiguation)
 Easter Island